Nik Naks may refer to:

 NikNaks (South African snack), a brand of corn extruded snack produced by the Simba Chip company in South Africa
 Nik Naks (British snack), a brand of corn extruded snack produced by KP Snacks in the United Kingdom